Josef Holeček (25 January 1921 – 20 February 2005) was a Czechoslovakian sprint canoeist who competed in the late 1940s and early 1950s. Competing in two Summer Olympics, he won gold medals in the C-1 1000 m event in both 1948 and 1952.

Holeček was born in Říčany. In addition to his Olympic record, he won two medals at the 1950 ICF Canoe Sprint World Championships in Copenhagen with a gold in the C-1 1000 m and a silver in the C-1 10000 m events.

References

1921 births
2005 deaths
People from Říčany
Canoeists at the 1948 Summer Olympics
Canoeists at the 1952 Summer Olympics
Czechoslovak male canoeists
Czech male canoeists
Olympic canoeists of Czechoslovakia
Olympic gold medalists for Czechoslovakia
Olympic medalists in canoeing
ICF Canoe Sprint World Championships medalists in Canadian
Medalists at the 1952 Summer Olympics
Medalists at the 1948 Summer Olympics
Sportspeople from the Central Bohemian Region